Rigel is an Argentinian sounding rocket. The double stage Rigel (first stage Canopus 1, second stage Orion-2) was launched seven times between 1969 and 1973. The Rigel rocket has a maximum altitude of 310 km, a launch mass of 300 kg, a diameter of 0.228 metres and a length of 6.30 metres.

References

Sounding rockets of Argentina
Space programme of Argentina
Solid-fuel rockets